Chelipoda is a genus of flies in the family Empididae.

Species

C. abjecta Collin, 1928
C. albiseta Zetterstedt, 1838
C. arcta Yang & Yang, 1990
C. aritarita Plant, 2007
C. atrocitas Plant, 2007
C. australpina Plant, 2007
C. basalis Yang & Yang, 1990
C. brevipennis Plant, 2007
C. consignata Collin, 1928
C. contracta Melander, 1947
C. coreana Wagner, 2003
C. cornigera Plant, 2007
C. cycloseta Plant, 2007
C. delecta Collin, 1928
C. delicata Meunier, 1908
C. didhami Plant, 2007
C. digressa Collin, 1931
C. dolosa Meunier, 1908
C. dominatrix Plant, 2007
C. elongata Melander, 1902
C. ferocitrix Plant, 2007
C. fimbriata Collin, 1933
C. flavida Brunetti, 1913
C. fuscicornis Bezzi, 1912
C. fusciseta Bezzi, 1912
C. fuscoptera Plant, 2007
C. gansuensis Yang & Yang, 1990
C. gracilis Plant, 2007
C. hamatilis Collin, 1933
C. hubeiensis Yang & Yang, 1990
C. inconspicua Collin, 1928
C. indica Brunetti, 1913
C. inexspectata Tuomikoski, 1966
C. intermedia Smith, 1962
C. interposita Collin, 1928
C. keta Smith, 1965
C. lateralis Plant, 2007
C. limitaria MacDonald, 1993
C. longicornis Collin, 1928
C. lyneborgi Yang & Yang, 1990
C. macrostigma Plant, 2007
C. mediolinea Plant, 2007
C. menglunana Grootaert, Yang & Saigusa, 2000
C. mengyangana Grootaert, Yang & Saigusa, 2000
C. mexicana Wheeler & Melander, 1901
C. mirabilis Collin, 1928
C. moderata Collin, 1928
C. modica Collin, 1928
C. mollis Wagner, 2003
C. monorhabdos Plant, 2007
C. nigrans Melander, 1928
C. nigraristata Yang, Grootaert & Horvat, 2004
C. oblata Collin, 1928
C. oblinata Smith, 1989
C. oblinita Collin, 1928
C. obtusipennis Collin, 1933
C. otiraensis Miller, 1923
C. parva Melander, 1928
C. petiolata Yang & Yang, 1987
C. pictipennis Bezzi, 1912
C. praestans Melander, 1947
C. puhihiroa Plant, 2007
C. rakiuraensis Plant, 2007
C. rangopango Plant, 2007
C. recurva Collin, 1928
C. remissa Collin, 1933
C. rhabdoptera Melander, 1928
C. secreta Collin, 1928
C. shennongana Yang & Yang, 1990
C. sicaria Melander, 1947
C. sichuanensis Yang & Yang, 1993
C. sinensis Yang & Yang, 1987
C. subflava Collin, 1933
C. tainuia Plant, 2007
C. tangerina Plant, 2007
C. trepida Collin, 1928
C. tribulosus Yang, Yang & Hu, 2002
C. truncata MacDonald, 1993
C. ulrichi Yang, Yang & Hu, 2002
C. ultraferox Plant, 2007
C. vaga Meunier, 1908
C. venatrix Plant, 2007
C. vittata Lynch Arribálzaga, 1878
C. vocatoria Fallén, 1815
C. wudangensis Yang & Yang, 1990
C. xanthocephala Yang & Yang, 1990

References

Empidoidea genera
Empididae
Taxa named by Pierre-Justin-Marie Macquart